2-Fluoroethanol is the organic compound with the formula CH2FCH2OH. This colorless liquid is one of the simplest stable fluorinated alcohols. It was once used as a pesticide. The related difluoro- and trifluoroethanols are far less dangerous.

Synthesis
2-Fluoroethanol was originally synthesized by treating 2-chloroethanol with potassium fluoride, in a simple Finkelstein reaction. The product has a lower boiling point that the starting material and may be conveniently isolated by distillation.

ClCH2CH2OH + KF → FCH2CH2OH + KCl

Similar procedures start from (1,3)-dioxolan-2-one and from 2-bromoethanol.

Structure and reactivity
Hydrogen bonding stabilizes the gauche conformer.

In a basic solution, 2-fluoroethanol undergoes dehydrofluorination, giving acetaldehyde.

Reaction of 2-fluoroethanol with trifluoromethanesulfonic anhydride in the presence of base gives the triflate ester.

PET radiotracers 
2-[18F]-fluoroethoxy group is a common moiety in the structures of radiotracers used with PET. Such radiotracers include fluoroethyl-l-tyrosine 1-(2-[18F]-fluoroethoxy)-4-nitrobenzene and [18F]-fluoroethyl 4-fluorobenzoate, being a [18F]fluoroalkyl ether and ester respectively.

Metabolism
It was patented as a rodenticide in Germany in 1935. In rats, it was found that fluoroethanol induced a similar toxicity as that of fluoroacetate, known to metabolize to fluorocitrate to exert the toxic effect.

2-Fluoroethanol is converted by alcohol dehydrogenase (ADH) using nicotinamide adenine dinucleotide (NAD+) as cofactor, ultimately leading to the formation of fluoroacetaldehyde and then fluoroacetate.

Fluoroacetate is a precursor to fluorocitrate, an inhibitor of aconitase, an enzyme that participates in the TCA cycle.

Toxicity
Reported effects of 2-fluoroethanol are epigastric distress effects, such as vomiting, and central nervous effects, such as auditory hallucinations, numbness feeling of the face or nose. Both these types of effects occur gradually after being exposed to 2-fluoroethanol for several hours. Some more severe reactions of the human body to 2-fluoroethanol can be respiratory failure and epileptiform convulsions or seizures, leading to dysfunctions in the heart mechanism. From the early 20th century, there are multiple reports of deaths caused by 2-fluoroethanol.

2-Fluoroethanol is also toxic to other animals with LD50 ranging from 7 to 1500 mg/kg bodyweight.

See also
 1,3-Difluoro-2-propanol
 4-Fluorobutanol

References

Rodenticides
Primary alcohols
Organofluorides
Fluoroethyl compounds
Organic compounds with 2 carbon atoms
Fluoroethanols